The Church of Saint Nicholas(), former Selimije Mosque (Albanian: Xhamia e Selimies), or Church of Lezhë (Kisha-Xhami) is a ruined historic church where the remains of Skanderbeg are said to be preserved in Lezhë, Albania. It is now used as Skanderbeg's Mausoleum in Lezhë, Albania.

History 

Originally, the building was a church, named after Saint Nicholas. A fresco of the saint is still present in the remains of the church, although heavily damaged. The Church was located in the interior part of an Illyrian City which was later reconstructed by the Romans, in the 1st century BC. Evidence for this is the "Gaviarius" (Gaviarivs) Stone in front of the entrance, which was unearthed during the Archaeological Excavations in 1975-1980 by Frano Prendi and Koço Zheku.

When the Ottomans conquered Albania, they plundered the church and turned it into a mosque, by adding a dikka, a mihrab and a large minaret. The mosque was named after the Ottoman Sultan Selim I. The trouble that Skanderbeg caused to the Ottoman Empire's military forces was such that when the Ottomans found the grave of Skanderbeg in the St. Nicolas they opened it and made amulets of his bones, believing that these would confer bravery on the wearer. The St. Nicolas' Church was rebuilt by the Ottomans elsewhere in return as a gesture of tolerance towards Christians.

The Selimiye mosque was one of the last buildings from the Middle Ages in Lezhë and did not survive during the dictatorship of Enver Hoxha, who destroyed all mosques in Lezhë. The minaret of the Selimie mosque was torn down. In 1981, the Skanderbeg Mausoleum opened here.

Restoration 
In early 2018 restoration projects for the Mausoleum were announced and began in June 2018. Restoration has now finished.

References 

Cultural Monuments of Albania
Mosques in Albania
Buildings and structures in Lezhë
Conversion of non-Christian religious buildings and structures into churches
Mosques converted from churches in Europe
Buildings and structures demolished in 1979
Mosques destroyed by communists
Tourist attractions in Lezhë County